Peer Günt are a hard rock band from Kouvola, Finland, formed in 1976. The band became known in the mid- to late 1980s with three successful albums, Peer Günt (1985), Backseat (1986), and Good Girls Don't... (1987).

Current members 
 Timo Nikki — vocals, guitar
 Pete Pohjanniemi — bass
 Sakke Koivula — drums

Former members 
 Vesa Suopanki — bass (1976-1977)
 Pauli Johansson — drums (1976-1977)
 Jussi Kylliäinen — secondary lead guitar (1977)
 Jukka Loikala — bass (1977-1979, 1981-1982)
 Reima Saarinen — drums (1977-1981)
 Seppo Karjalainen — keyboard (1977-1978)
 Timo Kipahti — vocals, guitar (1979)
 Petri Korppi — bass (1979-1981)
 Teijo "Twist Twist" Erkinharju — drums (1981-2005)
 Teijo "Tsöötz" Kettula — bass (1983-2005)

Discography

Albums 
 Peer Günt (1985)
 Backseat (1986)
 Good Girls Don't... (1987)
 Fire Wire (1988)
 Don't Mess with the Countryboys (1990)
 Smalltown Maniacs (1994)
 No Piercing, No Tattoo (2005)
 Guts and Glory (2007)
 Buck the Odds (2009)

Finnish musical groups
Finnish rock music groups
Finnish hard rock musical groups
Finnish blues rock musical groups
Finnish heavy metal musical groups
Musical groups established in 1976
1976 establishments in Finland